The Sfântu Gheorghe minibus accident took place on October 5, 2019 near Sfântu Gheorghe village in Ialomița County, south-eastern Romania. It was the worst accident in Romania in recent years.

Incident

The minibus had left for a short time from the village of Munteni-Buzău, Ialomița county and headed for Bucharest. Around 05.00 in the morning, the minibus, operated by the CDI transport company, was smashed by a truck which was running on the opposite side of the road. The truck driver is alleged to have fallen asleep at the wheel, leading to the truck leaving its lane. The victims were transported to Bagdasar Arseni and Floreasca hospitals in Bucharest.

Reactions

The company Mega Image states in a Facebook post: "According to the first informations transmitted by IPJ Ialomița spokesperson, the accident was caused by the driver of the TIR entered the counter, entering full collision with the minibus in which they were our colleagues. We are with the grieving families and we will support them in all the necessary steps".

The Transport Minister, Răzvan Cuc, states in a Facebook post: "Because the Romanians are waiting for us, those who care about us, solutions, especially in such situations, I decided to convene at 4:00 pm an operational committee with all the decision makers involved to take the necessary measures so that such tragedies do not recur. There will be a period of massive traffic jams to track down transportation companies and drivers who do not comply with the law, and we will apply drastic new measures in this area. Condolences to the families who are going through a difficult ordeal!".

The President of Romania, Klaus Iohannis, said during a campaign event for his re-election: "Today I received an awful message. There was a terrible accident between Urziceni and Slobozia, with ten dead and almost ten seriously injured. It made me very sad. Condolences, I'm very sorry! Let us understand from here that the lack of infrastructure kills as well as corruption kills. This criminal negligence of the PSD costs the lives of Romanians".

See also

Scânteia train accident (2009)
Huțani bus accident (1980)
2013 Podgorica bus crash

References

Road incidents in Romania
2019 road incidents
Ialomița County
October 2019 events in Romania
2019 in Romania
2019 disasters in Romania